Alan Edmund William Edwards AM MBE (17 January 1925 – 14 January 2003) was a British actor and founding Artistic Director of the Queensland Theatre Company in Brisbane, Queensland, Australia.

He was considered a major contributor to the artistic life of Queensland and was appointed MBE (Member of the Order of the British Empire) and Member of the Order of Australia for his services to theatre. He was also made an honorary Doctor of Letters by the University of Southern Queensland.

Edwards won a scholarship to the Royal Academy of Dramatic Art. He also obtained the same for the Old Vic School. After completing his training, he worked in various repertory theatres in England and Scotland before joining the Birmingham Repertory Theatre. From 1956, he worked mainly in London in film, theatre and radio. He also directed many plays, especially when Artistic Director of the Queensland Theatre Company.

Career
In 1960, he appeared in the British film, The Unstoppable Man, as the Station Constable.
He began his teaching career at the Royal Academy of Dramatic Art. He also taught at the Central School of Speech and Drama, Rose Bruford College and Toynbee Hall. In 1964 he was brought to Australia to teach at the National Institute of Dramatic Art, Sydney. During this time Edwards also managed to act with The Old Tote Theatre Company, The Theatre Royal, Hobart and played many roles on television for the ABC and commercial networks.

Edwards founded and built up the first state theatre company in Queensland in 1969 and in the process helping to establish the career of future star Geoffrey Rush as well as Bille Brown, Carol Burns and many others. He was so highly esteemed that celebrity actors such as Diane Cilento came back to Brisbane to work with him. In 1988 Alan Edwards was succeeded in the post of Artistic Director by Aubrey Mellor.

Edwards served on the Theatre Board of the Australia Council and was also Chairman of the Steering Committee which brought into being the Confederation of Australian Performing Arts (CAPPA) and later served as its vice-chairman. He was a board member of the Queensland Performing Arts Trust for 10 years, Inaugural President of the Actors' & Entertainers' Benevolent Fund (Qld) Inc., Patron of the Queensland Theatre of the Deaf, a Member of the Immigration Review Panel (Queensland) and was a Justice of the Peace.

In 1994 Edwards became a recipient of a Brisbane Theatre Critic's Matilda Award. In 1997 he received The Glugs of Gosh Award for Excellence in Theatre and in 1998 he was awarded a Doctorate of Letters (honoris causa) by the University of Southern Queensland.

As the Founding Director of the Queensland Theatre Company Alan made many appearances with the company and was acclaimed for his performances in such roles as Salieri in Amadeus, The Psychiatrist in Equus, Professor Higgins in Pygmalion, Dr Alfred Feldman in Duet For One and The Chorus in Henry V. Other roles have included Judge Don Gusman in The Marriage of Figaro, Baptista in The Taming of the Shrew for Queensland Ballet, Cicero in Julius Caesar, Sir Peter Teazle in The School For Scandal, Richard Noakes in Arcadia and Mr Diagilsmith in Tightrope. Edwards also appeared in a variety of roles with companies including Sydney Theatre Company, Northside Theatre Company, Phillip Street Productions, La Boite Theatre, The House is Live, Opera Queensland, Queensland Performing Arts Trust and Seymour Productions.

As a Director some of his favourite productions were the musicals Annie and Hello Dolly!, Blithe Spirit, Henry V, Long Days Journey into Night and Caravan.

Edwards final appearance was as part of The Way We Were in the Playhouse Theatre at the Queensland Performing Arts Complex, a special performance that looked back and saluted the rich arts and entertainment history and performers of Queensland. He was and will remain an indelible part of that history.

The charity The Actors' & Entertainers Benevolent Fund of Queensland was started by Edwards in 1975 and he was the inaugural president of the organisation. Edwards served in that role until 1994.

Interviews and historical information 
History of the Queensland Theatre Company Queensland Theatre Company website
Interview about the late Alan Edwards by Anne O'Keeffe with Bille Brown and Marjorie Ford, ABC612 Australia, Radio – 15 January 2003

References

External links 
 
 612ABC Brisbane
 Queensland Theatre Company website
 Actors' & Entertainers' Benevolent Fund (Qld) website
 https://web.archive.org/web/20060917185639/http://www.ozco.gov.au/arts_in_australia/artists/artists_major_performing_arts/queensland_theatre_company/

Australian male stage actors
Members of the Order of the British Empire
Members of the Order of Australia
1925 births
2003 deaths
Place of birth missing
Alumni of RADA
British emigrants to Australia